The 1852 United States presidential election was the 17th quadrennial presidential election, held on Tuesday, November 2, 1852. Democrat Franklin Pierce defeated Whig nominee General Winfield Scott. A third party candidate from the Free Soil party, John P. Hale, also ran and came in third place, but got no electoral votes.

Incumbent Whig President Millard Fillmore had succeeded to the presidency in 1850 upon the death of President Zachary Taylor. Fillmore endorsed the Compromise of 1850 and enforced the Fugitive Slave Law. This earned Fillmore Southern voter support and Northern voter opposition. On the 53rd ballot of the sectionally divided 1852 Whig National Convention, Scott defeated Fillmore for the nomination. Democrats divided among four major candidates at the 1852 Democratic National Convention. On the 49th ballot, dark horse candidate Franklin Pierce won nomination by consensus compromise. The Free Soil Party, a third party opposed to the extension of slavery in the United States and into the territories, nominated New Hampshire Senator John P. Hale.

With few policy differences between the two major candidates, the election became a personality contest. Though Scott had commanded in the Mexican–American War, Pierce also served. Scott strained Whig Party unity as his anti-slavery reputation gravely damaged his campaign in the South. A group of Southern Whigs and a separate group of Southern Democrats each nominated insurgent tickets, but both efforts failed to attract support.

Pierce and running mate William R. King won a comfortable popular majority, carrying 27 of the 31 states. Pierce won the highest share of the electoral vote since James Monroe's uncontested 1820 re-election. The Free Soil Party regressed to less than five percent of the national popular vote, down from more than ten percent in 1848, while overwhelming defeat and disagreement about slavery soon drove the Whig Party to disintegrate. Anti-slavery Whigs and Free Soilers would ultimately coalesce into the new Republican Party, which would quickly become a formidable movement in the free states.

Not until 1876 would Democrats again win a majority of the popular vote for president, and not until 1932 would they win a majority in both the popular vote and the electoral college.

Nominations

Democratic Party nomination

 Franklin Pierce, former U.S. senator from New Hampshire
 Lewis Cass, U.S. senator from Michigan
 James Buchanan, former U.S. secretary of state from Pennsylvania
 William L. Marcy, former U.S. secretary of war from New York
 Stephen Douglas, U.S. senator from Illinois

The Democratic Party held its national convention in Baltimore, Maryland, in June 1852. Benjamin F. Hallett, the chair of the Democratic National Committee, limited the sizes of the delegations to their electoral votes and a vote to maintain the two-thirds requirement for the presidential and vice-presidential nomination was passed by a vote of 269 to 13.

James Buchanan, Lewis Cass, William L. Marcy, and Stephen A. Douglas were the main candidates for the nomination. All of the candidates led the ballot for the presidential nomination at one point, but all of them failed to meet the two-thirds requirement. Franklin Pierce was put up for the nomination by the Virginia delegation. Pierce won the nomination when the delegates switched their support to him after he had received the unanimous support of the delegates from New England. He won on the second day of balloting after forty-nine ballots.

The delegation from Maine proposed that the vice-presidential nomination should be given to somebody from the Southern United States with William R. King being specifically named. King led on the first ballot before winning on the second ballot.

Whig Party nomination

 Winfield Scott, commanding general of the U.S. Army from New Jersey
 Millard Fillmore, president of the United States from New York
 Daniel Webster, U.S. secretary of state from Massachusetts

The Whig Party held its national convention in Baltimore, Maryland, in June 1852. The call for the convention had been made by Whig members of the United States Congress and thirty-one states were represented. A vote to have each state's vote be based on its electoral college strength was passed by a vote of 149 to 144, but it was rescinded due to disagreements from the Southern states and smaller Northern states.

The party had been divided by the Compromise of 1850 and was divided over the presidential nomination between incumbent President Millard Fillmore, who received support from the South, and Winfield Scott, who received his support from the North. William H. Seward, who had been the main opponent of the compromise in the United States Senate and advised President Zachary Taylor against it, supported Scott. Fillmore offered to give his delegates to Daniel Webster if he received the support of forty-one delegates on his own, but Webster was unsuccessful. Scott won the nomination on the 53rd ballot. William Alexander Graham won the vice-presidential nomination without a formal vote.

Free Soil Party nomination 

 John P. Hale, U.S. senator from New Hampshire

The Free Soil Party was still the strongest third party in 1852. However, following the Compromise of 1850, most of the "Barnburners" who supported it in 1848 had returned to the Democratic Party while most of the Conscience Whigs rejoined the Whig Party. The second Free Soil National Convention assembled in the Masonic Hall in Pittsburgh, Pennsylvania. New Hampshire senator John P. Hale was nominated for president with 192 delegate votes (sixteen votes were cast for a smattering of candidates). George Washington Julian of Indiana was nominated for vice president over Samuel Lewis of Ohio and Joshua R. Giddings of Ohio.

Union Party nomination 

The Union party was formed in 1850, an offshoot of the Whig party in several Southern states, including Georgia. As the 1852 presidential election approached, Union party leaders decided to wait and see who was nominated by the two major parties. The movement to nominate Daniel Webster as a third-party candidate began in earnest following the Whig Convention, largely driven by those who had been strenuously opposed to Winfield Scott's nomination for president, among them Alexander Stephens, Robert Toombs, and George Curtis. While Webster was against what he perceived as a "revolt" from the Whig Party and preferred not to be nominated, he let Americans vote for him should the party choose to nominate him.

The Union Party held its Georgia state convention on August 9, 1852, and nominated Webster for president and Charles J. Jenkins of Georgia for vice president. A formal convention was held at Faneuil Hall in Boston, Massachusetts, on September 15, affirming the nominations made at the state convention in Georgia and rejecting Winfield Scott as nothing more than a military figure. The Webster/Jenkins ticket received nationwide support, particularly among Southern Whigs, but also in Massachusetts and New York, but it was largely perceived by many as nothing more than getting voters who would, in different circumstances, support Scott.

Webster had no real chance of winning the election, but even the new Know-Nothing party endorsed Webster and Jenkins, nominating them without even their own permission. However, Webster died nine days before the election of a cerebral hemorrhage on October 24, 1852.

Native American (Know-Nothing) Party nomination 
Around the mid-1830s, nativists were present in New York politics, under the aegis of the American Republican Party. The American Republican party was formed in 1843 in major opposition to Catholicism and Catholic immigrants. In 1845, the party changed its name to the Native American Party. Their opponents nicknamed them the "Know Nothings" and the party liked the name and it became the nickname of the party after that until it collapsed in 1860. In 1852, the original presidential nominee planned by the Native American Party was Daniel Webster, the presidential nominee of the Union party. They nominated Webster without his permission, with George Corbin Washington (grandnephew of George Washington) as his vice presidential running mate. Webster died of natural causes nine days before the election, and the Know-Nothings quickly replaced Webster by nominating Jacob Broom for president and replaced Washington with Reynell Coates for vice president. In the future, former President Millard Fillmore would be their presidential nominee in 1856.

Southern Rights Party nomination 
 George Troup, former U.S. senator from Georgia

The Southern Rights Party was an offshoot of the Democratic party in several Southern states which advocated secession from the Union, electing a number of Congressmen and holding referendums on secession in a number of southern states, none of which were successful.

It was unclear in early 1852 if the Party would contest the presidential election. When the Alabama state convention was held in early March, only nine counties were represented. The party decided to see who was nominated by the two major national parties and support one of them if possible. When Georgia held its state convention, it acted as the state Democratic Party and sent delegates to the national convention.

After the Democratic National Convention, the Party was not sure that it wanted to support Franklin Pierce and William R. King, the Democratic nominees. Alabama held a state convention from July 13–15 and discussed at length the options of running a separate ticket or supporting Pierce and King. The convention was unable to arrive at a decision, deciding to appoint a committee to review the positions of Scott/Graham and Pierce/King with the option of calling a "national" convention if the two major-party tickets appeared deficient. The committee took its time reviewing the positions of Pierce and Scott, finally deciding on August 25 to call a convention for a Southern Rights Party ticket.

The convention assembled in Montgomery, Alabama, with 62 delegates present, a committee to recommend a ticket being appointed while the delegates listened to speeches in the interim. The committee eventually recommended former senator George Troup of Georgia for president, and former Governor John Quitman of Mississippi for vice president; they were unanimously nominated.

The two nominees accepted their nominations soon after the convention, which was held rather late in the season. Troup stated in a letter, dated September 27 and printed in the New York Times on October 16, that he had planned to vote for Pierce/King and had always wholeheartedly supported William R.D. King. He indicated in the letter that he preferred to decline the honor, as he was rather ill at the time and feared that he would die before the election. The Party's executive committee edited the letter to excise those portions which indicated that Troup preferred to decline, a fact which was revealed after the election.

Liberty Party nomination 
The Liberty Party had ceased to become a significant political force after most of its members joined the Free Soil Party in 1848. Nonetheless, some of those who rejected the fusion strategy held a Liberty Party National Convention in Buffalo, New York. There were few delegates present, so a ticket was recommended and a later convention called. The Convention recommended Gerrit Smith of New York for president and Charles Durkee of Wisconsin for vice president. A second convention was held in Syracuse, New York, in early September 1852, but it too failed to draw enough delegates to select nominees. Yet a third convention gathered in Syracuse later that month and nominated William Goodell of New York for president and S.M. Bell of Virginia for vice president.

General election

Fall campaign 

The Whigs' platform was almost indistinguishable from that of the Democrats, reducing the campaign to a contest between the personalities of the two candidates. The lack of clearcut issues between the two parties helped drive voter turnout down to its lowest level since 1836. The decline was further exacerbated by Scott's antislavery reputation, which decimated the Southern Whig vote at the same time as the pro-slavery Whig platform undermined the Northern Whig vote. After the Compromise of 1850 was passed, many of the southern Whig Party members broke with the party's key figure, Henry Clay.

Finally, Scott's status as a war hero was somewhat offset by the fact that Pierce was himself a Mexican–American War brigadier general.

The Democrats adopted the slogan: The Whigs we Polked in forty-four, We'll Pierce in fifty-two, playing on the names of Pierce and former President James K. Polk.

Just nine days before the election, Webster died, causing many Union state parties to remove their slates of electors. The Union ticket appeared on the ballot in Georgia and Massachusetts, however.

Results 

When American voters went to the polls, Pierce won the electoral college in a landslide; Scott won only the states of Kentucky, Tennessee, Massachusetts, and Vermont, while the Free Soil vote collapsed to less than half of what Martin Van Buren had earned in the previous election, with the party taking no states. The fact that Daniel Webster received a substantial share of the vote in Georgia and Massachusetts, even though he was dead, shows how disenchanted voters were with the two main candidates.

In the popular vote, while Pierce outpolled Scott by 220,000 votes, 17 states were decided by less than 10%, and eight by less than 5%. A shift of 69,000 votes to Scott in Delaware, Maryland, New York, North Carolina, Ohio and Pennsylvania would have left the electoral college in a 148–148 tie, forcing a contingent election in the House of Representatives.

As a result of the devastating defeat and the growing tensions within the party between pro-slavery Southerners and anti-slavery Northerners, the Whig Party quickly fell apart after the 1852 election and ceased to exist. Some Southern Whigs would join the Democratic Party, and many Northern Whigs would help to form the new Republican Party in 1854.

Some Whigs in both sections would support the so-called "Know-Nothing" party in the 1856 presidential election. Similarly, the Free Soil Party rapidly fell away into obscurity after the election, and the remaining members mostly opted to join the former Northern Whigs in forming the Republican Party.

The Southern Rights Party effectively collapsed following the election, attaining only five percent of the vote in Alabama, and a few hundred in its nominee's home state of Georgia. It would elect a number of Congressmen in 1853, but they would rejoin the Democratic Party upon taking their seats in Congress.

Source (Popular Vote): 
Source (Electoral Vote): 
 The leading candidates for vice president were both born in North Carolina and in fact both attended the University of North Carolina at Chapel Hill, albeit two decades apart. While there, they were members of opposing debate societies: the Dialectic and Philanthropic Societies. Both also served in North Carolina politics: King was a representative from North Carolina before he moved to Alabama, and Graham was a governor of North Carolina.

Records
This was the last election in which the Democrats won Michigan until 1932, the last in which the Democrats won Iowa, Maine, New Hampshire, Ohio or Rhode Island until 1912, the last in which the Democrats won Wisconsin until 1892, the last in which the Democrats won Connecticut until 1876 and the last in which the Democrats won New York until 1868. It was, however, the last election in which the Democrats' chief opponent won Kentucky until 1896, and indeed the last until 1928 in which the Democrats' opponent obtained an absolute majority in the Bluegrass State.

Geography of results

Cartographic gallery

Results by state 
Source: Data from Walter Dean Burnham, Presidential ballots, 1836–1892 (Johns Hopkins University Press, 1955) pp 247–57.

Close states

States where the margin of victory was under 1%:
Delaware 0.19% (25 votes)
North Carolina 0.90% (735 votes)

States where the margin of victory was under 5%:
Tennessee 1.46% (1,686 votes)
Kentucky 3.12% (3,934 votes)
Louisiana 3.88% (1,392 votes)
Connecticut 4.23% (2,890 votes)
Ohio 4.65% (16,410 votes)

States where the margin of victory was under 10%:
Pennsylvania 5.02% (19,458 votes)
New York 5.21% (27,201 votes) (tipping point state)
Iowa 5.39% (1,907 votes)
California 6.19% (4,749 votes)
Massachusetts 6.38% (8,114 votes)
Rhode Island 6.52% (1,109 votes)
Maryland 6.59% (4,945 votes)
New Jersey 6.91% (5,749 votes)
Indiana 7.88% (14,439 votes)
Michigan 9.62% (7,982 votes)

Electoral college selection

See also 
 History of the United States (1849–65)
 Inauguration of Franklin Pierce
 Second Party System
 1852–53 United States House of Representatives elections
 1852–53 United States Senate elections

Notes

References

Further reading
 Blue, Frederick J. The Free Soilers: Third-Party Politics, 1848-54 (U of Illinois Press, 1973).
 Chambers, William N., and Philip C. Davis. "Party, Competition, and Mass Participation: The Case of the Democratizing Party System, 1824-1852." in The history of American electoral behavior (Princeton University Press, reprinted 2015) pp. 174-197.
 Foner, Eric. "Politics and prejudice: The Free Soil party and the Negro, 1849-1852." Journal of Negro History 50.4 (1965): 239-256. online
 Gara, Larry. The Presidency of Franklin Pierce (UP of Kansas, 1991).
 Gienapp, William E. The origins of the Republican Party, 1852-1856 (Oxford UP, 1987).

 Holt, Michael F. The Rise and Fall of the American Whig Party: Jacksonian Politics and the Onset of the Civil War. (Oxford University Press, 1999).
 Holt, Michael F. Franklin Pierce: The American Presidents Series: The 14th President, 1853-1857 (Macmillan, 2010).
 Marshall, Schuyler C. "The Free Democratic Convention of 1852." Pennsylvania History 22.2 (1955): 146-167. online

 Morrison, Michael A. "The Election of 1852." American Presidential Campaigns and Elections (Routledge, 2020) pp. 349–366.
 Nevins, Allan. Ordeal of the Union: A house dividing, 1852-1857. Vol. 2 (1947) pp 3–42.
 Nichols, Roy Franklin. The Democratic Machine, 1850–1854 (1923) online
 Riddle, Wesley Allen. "Unrestraint Begets Calamity: The American Whig Review, 1845-1852." Humanitas 11.2 (1998). online
 Wilentz, Sean. The rise of American democracy: Jefferson to Lincoln (2006) pp 659–667.

States
 Baum, Dale. "Know-Nothingism and the Republican majority in Massachusetts: The political realignment of the 1850s." Journal of American History 64.4 (1978): 959-986. online
 Beeler, Dale. "The Election of 1852 in Indiana." Indiana Magazine of History (1915): 301–323. online
 Campbell, Randolph. "The Whig Party of Texas in the Elections of 1848 and 1852." Southwestern Historical Quarterly 73.1 (1969): 17-34. online

 Huston, James L. "The Illinois Political Realignment of 1844–1860: Revisiting the Analysis." Journal of the Civil War Era 1.4 (2011): 506-535. online

 Morrill, James R. "The Presidential Election of 1852: Death Knell of the Whig Party of North Carolina." North Carolina Historical Review 44.4 (1967): 342-359 online.
 Rosenberg, Morton M. "The Iowa Elections of 1852." Annals of Iowa 38.4 (1966). online
 Solomon, Irvin D. "The Grass Roots Appearance of a National Party: The Formation of the Republican Party in Erie, Pennsylvania, 1852-1856." Western Pennsylvania History (1983): 209-222. online

 Sweeney, Kevin. "Rum, Romanism, Representation, and Reform: Coalition Politics in Massachusetts, 1847-1853." Civil War History 22.2 (1976): 116-137.
 Walton, Brian G. "Arkansas Politics during the Compromise Crisis, 1848-1852." Arkansas Historical Quarterly 36.4 (1977): 307-337. online

Primary sources
 Chester, Edward W A guide to political platforms (1977) online
 Porter, Kirk H. and Donald Bruce Johnson, eds. National party platforms, 1840-1964 (1965) online 1840-1956

Web sites

External links 

 Presidential Election of 1852: A Resource Guide from the Library of Congress
 1852 popular vote by counties
 1852 state-by-state popular vote

 Election of 1852 in Counting the Votes 

 
Presidency of Franklin Pierce
Franklin Pierce
November 1852 events